Lapenne is a commune in the Ariège department in southwestern France.

Population

Sights
Le Parc aux Bambous

See also
Communes of the Ariège department

References

Communes of Ariège (department)
Ariège communes articles needing translation from French Wikipedia